Oospira is a genus of terrestrial gastropods belonging to the subfamily Phaedusinae of the family Clausiliidae. 

The species of this genus are found in Asia.

Species
 
Oospira abstrusa 
Oospira acehensis 
Oospira aciculata 
Oospira alticola 
Oospira arakana 
Oospira asaluensis 
Oospira asiphonia  
Oospira baziniana 
Oospira bensoni 
Oospira binaria 
Oospira blanfordi 
Oospira bolovenica 
Oospira bouddah 
Oospira brachyptychia 
Oospira brevior 
Oospira bulbus 
Oospira butoti 
Oospira coffea 
Oospira cornea 
Oospira dancei 
Oospira decollata 
Oospira delavayana 
Oospira duci 
Oospira eregia 
Oospira ferruginea 
Oospira fornicata 
Oospira fruhstorferi 
Oospira fusiformis 
Oospira gastroptychia 
Oospira gerlachi 
Oospira goniostoma 
Oospira gouldiana 
Oospira gracilenta 
Oospira haivanensis 
Oospira imprimata 
Oospira indurata 
Oospira insignis 
Oospira jacobsoni 
Oospira javana 
Oospira jensi 
Oospira jinyungensis 
Oospira johorensis 
Oospira junghuhni 
Oospira khanhi 
Oospira lepidospira 
Oospira longispina 
Oospira loosjesi 
Oospira loosjesiana 
Oospira loxostoma 
Oospira mairei 
Oospira malaisei 
Oospira malleolata 
Oospira mansonensis 
Oospira minutissima 
Oospira miranda 
Oospira mongmitensis 
Oospira naga 
Oospira naggsi 
Oospira nevilliana  (species inquirendum)
Oospira nubigena 
Oospira obesa 
Oospira ootayoshinarii 
Oospira orientalis 
Oospira ovata 
Oospira oviformis 
Oospira penangensis 
Oospira philippiana 
Oospira phyllostoma 
Oospira pocsi 
Oospira raehlei 
Oospira recedens 
Oospira salacana 
Oospira sardicola 
Oospira scalariformis 
Oospira schepmani 
Oospira semipolita 
Oospira siderea 
Oospira stoliczkana 
Oospira suluana 
Oospira sumatrana 
Oospira sykesi 
Oospira tetraptyx 
Oospira thausta 
Oospira triptyx 
Oospira truncatula 
Oospira umbratica 
Oospira vanbuensis 
Oospira vespa 
Oospira wuellerstorffi 
Oospira yanghaoi 
Oospira zhaoyifani

Synonyms
 Oospira antilopina (Heude, 1885): synonym of Formosana antilopina (Heude, 1885) (unaccepted combination)
 Oospira assaluensis (Blanford, 1872): synonym of Oospira (Oospira) asaluensis (W. T. Blanford, 1872) represented as Oospira asaluensis (W. T. Blanford, 1872) (incorrect subsequent spelling)
 Oospira corticina (L. Pfeiffer, 1842): synonym of Phaedusa (Phaedusa) corticina (L. Pfeiffer, 1842) represented as Phaedusa corticina (L. Pfeiffer, 1842) (unaccepted combination)
 Oospira cuongi (Maasen & Gittenberger, 2007): synonym of Oospira eregia cuongi (Maassen & Gittenberger, 2007)
 Oospira cuongi (Maassen & Gittenberger, 2007): synonym of Oospira eregia cuongi (Maassen & Gittenberger, 2007)
 Oospira elegans H. Nordsieck, 2012: synonym of Formosana elegans (H. Nordsieck, 2012) (original combination)
 Oospira formosensis (H. Adams, 1866): synonym of Formosana formosensis (H. Adams, 1866) (unaccepted combination)
 Oospira franzhuberi Szekeres & Thach, 2018: synonym of Oospira bolovenica (Möllendorff, 1898) (junior synonym)
 Oospira gregoi Szekeres & Thach, 2017: synonym of Messageriella gregoi (Szekeres & Thach, 2017) (original combination)
 Oospira huberi Thach, 2016: synonym of Castanophaedusa huberi (Thach, 2016) (original combination)
 Oospira liujinae Maassen, 2008: synonym of Formosana libonensis liujinae (Maassen, 2008) (original combination)
 Oospira pacifica (Gredler, 1884): synonym of Formosana pacifica (Gredler, 1884) (unaccepted combination)
 Oospira seguiniana (Heude, 1885): synonym of Formosana seguiniana (Heude, 1885) (unaccepted combination)
 Oospira splendens H. Nordsieck, 2005: synonym of Formosana splendens (H. Nordsieck, 2005) (unaccepted combination)
 Oospira swinhoei (L. Pfeiffer, 1866): synonym of Formosana swinhoei (L. Pfeiffer, 1866) (unaccepted combination)

References

 Lindholm, W. A. (1924). A revised systematic list of the genera of the Clausiliidae, recent and fossil, with their subdivisions, synonymy, and types. Proceedings of the Malacological Society of London. 16 (1): 53‑64 [19 April]; 16 (2): 65-80
  Ehrmann, P. (1927). Zur Systematik der Clausiliiden, besonders der ostasiatischen. Sitzungsberichte der Naturforschenden Gesellschaft zu Leipzig, 49/52 [1922-1925]: 18-59. Leipzig.
 Grego, J. & Szekeres, M. (2011). New taxa of Asiatic Clausiliidae (Mollusca: Gastropoda). Visaya. 3(2), 4-22.

External links
 Blanford, W. T. (1872). Monograph of Himalayan, Assamese, Barmese and Cingalese Clausiliae. Journal of the Asiatic Society of Bengal. 41(2): 199-206

Clausiliidae